Colton High School may refer to one of several high schools in the United States:

 Colton High School (California)
 Colton High School (Oregon)